Farhan Ally Agha (also spelled Farhan Ali Agha) is a Pakistani politician, film, television and voice actor who appears in Urdu television serials and films. He has dubbed the voice of Commander Safeguard in an animated series, Commander Safeguard and also dubbed the voice of Halit Ergenç in the drama serial Mera Sultan.

Acting career
Farhan started his modeling career in the early 1990s. Afterwards in 1995 he joined TV industry and started work in drama serials. In no time he became the top actor in that era. He is currently working on different channels in many drama serials.

Films

Television dramas
{| class="wikitable"
|-
! Year
!Title!!Role!!Notes
|-
|1995
|Jiiya Jaye ||  ||Debut drama
|-
|1995
|Tum Se Kehna Tha||  ||Adaptation of While You Were Sleeping
|-
|1999
|Dosri Dunia|| Shahab ||
|-
|2007
|Jaal||  ||

|-
|
|Nalaiq Manchaley||  ||
|-
|
|Saans Lay Ay Zindagi||  ||
|-
|
|Jin Se Pyaar Kia ||  ||
|-
|2009
|Sotayli||  ||
|-
|2009
|Betiyan||  ||
|-
|2010
|Dil-e-Abad|| Waqar ||
|-
|2011
|Choti Si Kahani ||Rajal
|
|-
| 2011
|Khushi Ek Roag||  ||
|-
|2012
|Mera Yaqeen|| Ahmer ||
|-
|2012
|Samjhauta Express||  ||
|-
|2012
|Meri Saheli Meri Humjoli||  ||
|-
|2011
|Meray Qatil Meray Dildar||Maham's elder brother
|
|-
|2012
|Mehar Bano aur Shah Bano||Hashim
|
|-
|2012
|Phir Kab Milo Gay||  ||
|-
|2014
|Hum Thehrey Gunahgar||  ||
|-
|2014
|Sadqay Tumhare||Khalil's father
|
|-
| 2015
|Inteha||  ||
|-
|2015
|Muqaddas||Akbar
|
|-
|2015
|Mere Humdum Mere Dost||Taufeeq Kamaal (Aimen's father)
|
|-
|2015
|Mera Yahan Koi Nahi||  ||
|-
|
|Najia||  ||
|-
| 2016 || Commander Safeguard's Mission: Clean Sweep: Jungle Main Mungle || Dartoo|| Voice
|-
|2015
|Tere Baghair||Iftikhar
|
|-
|2016
|Kitni Girhain Baaki Hain 2
|Jameel/Baby's father
|Episode 21, 34
|-
| 2017
|Kaisi Yeh Paheli||  ||
|-
|2017
|Jithani||  ||
|-
|2017
|Yaqeen Ka Safar|| Barrister Usman Ali Khan||
|-
|2017
|Alif Allah Aur Insaan|| Nawazish ||
|-
| 2017
|Mohabbat Tumse Nafrat Hai|| Mashood ||G

|-
|2018
|Suno Chanda||Jamshed ||
|-
|2018
|Tawaan|| Wajahad ||
|-
|2019||Anaa ||Azam ||
|-
|2019|| Suno Chanda 2||Jamshed
|Hum TV
|-
|2019||Yeh Dil Mera||Ghauri ||
|-
|2019||Makafaat||||Episode 16
|-
|2019-20||Tera Yahan Koi Nahin||||
|-
|2020
|Umeed
|
|
|-
|2020
|Main Agar Chup Hoon
|Alam
|
|-
|2021
|Chupke Chupke
| Kifayat
|
|-
|2021
|Sila-e-Mohabbat
|Alizeh's father
|
|-
|2021
|Bebasi
| Sajid
|
|-
| rowspan="5" |2022
|Hum Tum
| Sultan
|
|-
|Meray Humnasheen
| Dr. Sheheryar
|
|-
|Dil Awaiz
|Sikandar's father
|
|-
|Nehar
|Kabir
|
|-
|Kala Doriya
|Munir Ikhtiar
|
|tere bin}

Awards and nominations 
 Nominee: Best Actor Drama Serial in a Supporting Role in The 1st Indus Drama Awards 2005
 Nominee: Best Actor in a Leading Role in Lux Style Awards 2007

Political career 
In December 2020, Farhan Ally Agha joined Pakistan Tehreek-e-Insaf.

References

External links 
 

Living people
1975 births
Pakistani male models
Pakistani male television actors